Pavel Medvedev (born January 8, 1992) is a Russian professional ice hockey player. He is currently playing with HC Donbass in the Ukrainian Hockey League (Ukraine).

Medvedev made his KHL debut playing with HC Spartak Moscow during the 2011–12 KHL season. He has also appeared with HC Yugra and HC Sochi.

References

External links

1992 births
Living people
Dizel Penza players
Metallurg Novokuznetsk players
HC Sochi players
HC Spartak Moscow players
Russian ice hockey forwards
Ice hockey people from Moscow
HC Yugra players